Bookless in Baghdad is a 2005 book by author Shashi Tharoor that consists of a collection of previously published articles, book reviews and columns on writers, books and literary musings.

In the title story, "Bookless in Baghdad", Tharoor writes about his experience when he visits Baghdad on a UN initiative soon after the Gulf War. The book contains five parts: Inspirations, Reconsiderations, The literary life, Appropriations and Interrogations.

2005 books
Indian non-fiction books
Books by Shashi Tharoor
21st-century Indian books